This is a list of high school athletic conferences in the Northwest Region of Ohio, as defined by the OHSAA. Because the names of localities and their corresponding high schools do not always match and because there is often a possibility of ambiguity with respect to either the name of a locality or the name of a high school, the following table gives both in every case, with the locality name first, in plain type, and the high school name second in boldface type. The school's team nickname is given last.

Blanchard Valley Conference

 Arcadia Redskins (1922-)
 Arlington Red Devils (1922-)
 Rawson Cory-Rawson Hornets (1950-)
 Findlay Liberty-Benton Eagles (1922-)
 McComb Panthers (1922-)
North Baltimore Tigers (2014-) 
 Pandora Pandora-Gilboa Rockets (football 1966-, all sports 1971-, also member of the Putnam County League)
 Mt. Blanchard Riverdale Falcons (2014-)
 Van Buren Black Knights (1922-)
 Vanlue Wildcats (1922-)

Former Members
 Mount Blanchard Purple Hurricanes (1922–1960, to Hardin County League)
 Mount Cory Hornets (1922–1950, consolidated into Cory-Rawson)
 Rawson Raiders (1922–5190, consolidated into Cory-Rawson)
 Dola Hardin Northern Polar Bears (1965-2014, to Northwest Central Conference)
 Rudolph Westwood Warriors (1965–1966, consolidated into Bowling Green)
 Bascom Hopewell-Loudon Chieftains (2014-2019, to Sandusky Bay Conference)
 Leipsic Vikings (football 1965-2021, all sports 1971-2021, to Northwest Conference)

Buckeye Border Conference

(non-football, established 1967)

 Edon Bombers (1967-)
 Fayette Eagles (1967-)
 West Unity Hilltop Cadets (1967-)
 Holgate Tigers (2021-)
Montpelier Locomotives (1967–78, 2016-)
 Pioneer North Central Eagles (1967-)
 Pettisville Blackbirds (1967-)
 Stryker Panthers (1967-)

(Edon, Hilltop, and Montpelier are members of the TAAC for football, but are members of this league for every other sport, the exception being Montpelier's wrestling program, which continues to compete in the NWOAL. Stryker is a member of the Northern 8 Football Conference for football)

Former members
Edgerton Bulldogs (1967–1975)
Hicksville Aces (1967–1975)

Firelands Conference

 Ashland Crestview Cougars (1982-)
 Ashland Mapleton Mounties (1963-)
 Monroeville Eagles (1960-)
 New London Wildcats (1970-)
 Plymouth Big Red (1982-)
 Norwalk St. Paul Flyers (1968-)
 Greenwich South Central Trojans (1960-)
 Collins Western Reserve Rough Riders (1960-)

Former members
 Berlin Heights Tigers (1960–68, consolidated into Edison)
 Milan Indians (1960–68, consolidated into Edison)
 Sandusky Perkins Pirates (1960–63)
 Hayesville Panthers (1963 only, consolidated into Hillsdale)1
 Jeromesville Blue Jays (1963 only, consolidated into Hillsdale)1
 Jeromesville Hillsdale Falcons (1963–70)
 Sullivan Black River Pirates (1964–93)
 Milan Edison Chargers (1968–86)

 Schools competed in spring sports in 1963, fall and winter 1962-63 sports competed in Ashland County League.

Green Meadows Conference
Conference Website: http://www.greenmeadowsconf.com

 Antwerp Archers (1972-)
 Ayersville Pilots (1962-)
 Edgerton Bulldogs (1975-)
 Sherwood Fairview Apaches (1962-)
 Hicksville Aces (1962-)
 Paulding  Panthers (1962–74, 2021-)
 Defiance Tinora Rams (1965-)
 Haviland Wayne Trace Raiders (1971-)

Former members
 Jewell Rams (1962–1965, consolidated into Tinora)
 Haviland Blue Creek Raiders (1966–1971, consolidated into Wayne Trace)
 Oakwood Auglaize-Brown Bobcats (1967–1972, consolidated into Paulding)
 Holgate Tigers (1971-2021, to Buckeye Border Conference)

Mid-Buckeye Conference

Conference Website: http://mbcsports.org/

The Mid-Buckeye Conference, known also at times as the Middle Buckeye Conference, has had three separate incarnations. The original league began in 1948 and lasted until 1962. The MBC reformed again in 1963 and lasted until 1979. The third and, so far, final reformation took place in 1981.

 Kidron Central Christian Comets (no football, 2015-)
 Crestline Bulldogs (2015-)
 Loudonville Redbirds (2004–)
 Lucas Cubs (1968–1979, Second reformation charter member 1981–1999, 2013-)
 Mansfield Christian Flames (no football, 1982-1983, 2013-)
 Mansfield St. Peter's Spartans (no football, 2013-)

(Crestline is a member of the Northwest Central Conference for football only. Loudonville is a member of the Knox Morrow Athletic Conference for football only. Lucas is an independent for football)

Former members
 Ashley Aces (1948–1952)
 Cardington-Lincoln Pirates (1948–1954)
 Centerburg Trojans (1948–1962, First reformation charter member, 1963–1977, Second reformation charter member, 1981–2013), joined Mid-Ohio Athletic Conference.
 Sunbury Eagles (1948–1949)
 Mount Gilead Indians (1949–1954)
 Johnstown-Monroe Johnnies (1950–1962, 1994–2013), rejoined Licking County League.
 Richwood Tigers (1950–1952, 1953–1954)
 Sunbury Big Walnut Golden Eagles (Consolidation of Sunbury and Galena, 1950–1954)
 Utica Redskins (1951–1958, 1960–1962, 1999–2013), rejoined Licking County League.
 Ashley Elm Valley Aces (Consolidation of Ashley, 1952–1954)
 Granville Blue Aces (1954–1962)
 Summit Station Hornets (1954–1956)
 Pataskala Watkins Memorial Warriors (Consolidation Of Etna, Kirkersville and Pataskala. 1955–1962)
 Summit Station Licking Heights Hornets (Consolidation of Summit Station, 1956–1962)
 Howard Bulldogs (First reformation charter member, 1963–1964)
 Mount Vernon St. Vincent de Paul Blue Streaks (First reformation charter member, 1963-1968/School closed)
 Howard East Knox Bulldogs (Consolidation of Howard and Bladensburg, 1964–1979, Second reformation charter member, 1981–2014), joined Mid-Ohio Athletic Conference.
 New Albany Eagles (1965–1972, 1984–1990)
 Gahanna Columbus Academy Vikings (1966–1977)
 Newark Catholic Green Wave (1966–1973)
 Zanesville Bishop Rosecrans Bishops (1977–1979)
 Bowerston Conotton Valley Rockets (1978–1979)
 Worthington Christian Warriors (1982-2004/no football)
 Johnstown Northridge Vikings (1986–2013), rejoined Licking County League.
 Fredericktown Freddies (1999–2013), joined Mid-Ohio Athletic Conference
 Danville Blue Devils (1954–1962, First reformation charter member, 1963–1979, Second reformation charter member, 1981–2017), joined the Knox-Morrow Athletic Conference

Midwest Athletic Conference

Conference Website: http://www.midwestathleticconference.com/

 Anna Rockets  (football only, 2006-)
 Coldwater Cavaliers (1972-)
 Fort Recovery Indians (1978-, Football 1995-)
 Maria Stein Marion Local Flyers (1972-)
 Minster Wildcats (1972-)
 New Bremen Cardinals (1972-)
 New Knoxville Rangers (no football, 1978-)
 Rockford Parkway Panthers (1972-)
 St. Henry Redskins (1972-)
 Delphos St. John's Blue Jays (1982-)
 Versailles Tigers (2001-)

Former Members
Ansonia Tigers (1972–78)
Bradford Railroaders (1972–78)
Mendon-Union Pirates (1978–92, consolidated into Parkway)

Northern 10 Athletic Conference

 New Washington Buckeye Central Bucks (2014-)
 Bucyrus Redmen (2014-)
 Carey Blue Devils (2014-)
 North Robinson Colonel Crawford Eagles (2014-)
 Sycamore Mohawk Warriors (2014-)
 Attica Seneca East Tigers (2014-)
Upper Sandusky Rams (Winter 2014-)
 Bucyrus Wynford Royals (2014-)

Former Members
 Crestline Bulldogs (2014-2015)
 Morral Ridgedale Rockets (2014-2021)

Northern Buckeye Conference

 Pemberville Eastwood Eagles (2011-)
 Bloomdale Elmwood Royals (2011-)
 Fostoria Redmen (2011-)
 Genoa Comets (2011-)
 Millbury Lake Flyers (2011-)
 Tontogany Otsego Knights (2011-)
 Rossford Bulldogs (2011-)
 Elmore Woodmore Wildcats (2011-)

Northern Lakes League

 Whitehouse Anthony Wayne Generals (1956-)
 Bowling Green Bobcats (1972-)
 Maumee Panthers (1956-)
 Napoleon Wildcats (2011-)
 Sylvania Northview Wildcats (1996-)
 Perrysburg Yellow Jackets (1956-)
 Sylvania Southview Cougars (1976-)
 Holland Springfield Blue Devils (1962-)

Former Members
 Pemberville Eastwood Eagles (1959-1972, to Suburban Lakes League)
 Bloomdale Elmwood Royals (1960-1972, to Suburban Lakes League)
 Millbury Lake Flyers (1960-1996, to Suburban Lakes League)
 Genoa Comets (1956-1972, to Suburban Lakes League)
Port Clinton Redskins (1956-1963)
 Rossford Bulldogs  (1956-2011, to Northern Buckeye Conference)

Northwest Central Conference

The conference began in 2001 with the dissolution of the West Central Ohio Conference.
 Crestline Bulldogs (football only, 2021-)
 Marion Elgin Comets (2017-)
 Dola Hardin Northern Polar Bears (2014-, football 2015-)
 Lima Perry Commodores (2004-)
 Morral Ridgedale Rockets (2021-)
 Ridgeway Ridgemont Golden Gophers (2001-)
 Lima Temple Christian Pioneers (no football, 2008-)
 McGuffey Upper Scioto Valley Rams (2001-)
 Waynesfield-Goshen Tigers (2001-)

Former Members
 Milford Center Fairbanks Panthers (2001–2013)
 Fort Loramie Redskins (football only, 2011–2017, to Cross County Conference)
 Sidney Lehman Catholic Cavaliers (2013-2021, to Three Rivers Conference)
 Marion Catholic Fighting Irish (no football, 2001–2013, school closed)
 DeGraff Riverside Pirates (2001-2021, to Three Rivers Conference)
 Fostoria St. Wendelin Mohawks (football only, 2009–2010)
 Troy Christian Eagles (football only, 2001–2004)
Yellow Springs Bulldogs (football only, 2003–2008)

Northwest Conference

All sports
 Ada Bulldogs (1957-)
 Harrod Allen East Mustangs (1965-)
 Bluffton Pirates (1957-)
 Columbus Grove Bulldogs (also in Putnam County League, 1972-)
 Convoy Crestview Knights (1971-)
 Delphos Jefferson Wildcats (1957-)
 Leipsic Vikings (1962–64, 2021-, also member of the Putnam County League)
 Van Wert Lincolnview Lancers (no football, 1965-)
 Spencerville Bearcats (1957-)

Former members
 Lafayette-Jackson Wolves (1947–65, consolidated into Allen East)
 Harrod Auglaize Wildcats (1957–65, consolidated into Allen East)
 Lima Bath Wildcats (1957–65)
 Beaverdam Beavers (1957–65, consolidated into Bluffton)
 Elida Bulldogs (1957–71)
 Gomer Bobcats (1957–69, consolidated into Elida)
 Paulding Panthers (1974-2021)
 Lima Perry Commodores (1960-2004)
 McGuffey Upper Scioto Valley Rams (1966-2001)
 Lima Central Catholic T-Birds (2006–13)

Football
 Ada Bulldogs (1963-)
 Harrod Allen East Mustangs (1965-)
 Bluffton Pirates (1953-)
 Columbus Grove Bulldogs (1947-)
 Convoy Crestview Knights (1970–81, 2000-; dropped program 1981-99)
 Delphos Jefferson Wildcats (1947-)
 Leipsic Vikings (1962–64, 2021-)
 Spencerville Bearcats (1947-)

Former Football Members
Lima Bath Wildcats (1963–65)
 Elida Bulldogs (1947–73)
 Forest Rangers (1947–62, consolidated into Riverdale)
 Lafayette-Jackson Wolves (1947–65, consolidated into Allen East)
 Lima Central Catholic T-Birds (2006–13)
 North Baltimore Tigers (1967–69)
 Ottawa-Glandorf Titans (1963–67)
 Pandora-Gilboa Rockets (1947–66)
 Paulding Panthers (1967-21)
 Lima Perry Commodores (1967-2004)
 Lima Shawnee Indians (1947–53)
McGuffey Upper Scioto Valley Rams (1978-2001)

Northwest Hockey Conference

Varsity 
Red Division

Whitehouse Anthony Wayne Generals
Bowling Green Bobcats
Findlay Trojans
Perrysburg Yellow Jackets
Sylvania Northview Wildcats
Toledo St. Francis de Sales Knights
Toledo St. John's Jesuit Titans

White Division

Oregon Clay Eagles
Sylvania Southview Cougars
Toledo Whitmer Panthers
Lake Flyers (USA Hockey/club)
Springfield Blue Devils (USA Hockey/club)

Junior Varsity 
Junior Varsity Division

 Whitehouse Anthony Wayne Generals (JV)
 Bowling Green Bobcats (JV)
 Findlay Trojans (JV)
Perrysburg Yellow Jackets (JV)
Sylvania Northview Wildcats (JV)
Toledo St. Francis de Sales Knights (JV)
Toledo St. John's Jesuit Titans (JV)

Northwest Ohio Athletic League

 Archbold Blue Streaks (1960-)
 Bryan Golden Bears (1926-)
 Delta Panthers (1926–31, 1957–69, 1978-)
 Metamora Evergreen Vikings (1969–71, 1978-)
 Liberty Center Tigers (1926-)
 Hamler Patrick Henry Patriots (1978-)
 Swanton Bulldogs (1957–69, 1978-)
 Wauseon Indians (1926-)

Affiliate
 Montpelier Locomotives (full member 1926-2016, wrestling only 2016-)

Former members
 Napoleon Wildcats (1926–1978)
 Defiance Bulldogs (1931–1955)

Northwest Ohio Catholic Schools Association
(this is a secondary conference for the smaller schools belonging to the Roman Catholic Diocese of Toledo)
Tiffin Calvert Senecas
Oregon Cardinal Stritch Cardinals
Lima Central Catholic Thunderbirds (infrequent participation)
Fremont St. Joseph Crimson Streaks
Mansfield St. Peter's Spartans (no football)
Sandusky St. Mary Central Catholic Panthers
Norwalk St. Paul Flyers

Ohio Cardinal Conference

 Ashland Arrows (2003–)
 Lexington Minutemen (2003–)
 Mansfield Madison Comprehensive Rams (2003–)
 Mansfield Senior Tygers (2003–)
 Mount Vernon Yellow Jackets (2016-)
 Millersburg West Holmes Knights (2003–)
 Wooster Generals (2003–)

Former Members
 Bellville Clear Fork Colts (2004–17, to Mid-Ohio Athletic Conference)
 Orrville Red Riders (2003–16, to Principals Athletic Conference)

Putnam County League
(no football)

 Columbus Grove Bulldogs (also member of the Northwest Conference including football, 1930-)
 Continental Pirates (1930-)
 Fort Jennings Musketeers (1930-)
 Kalida Wildcats (1930-)
 Leipsic Vikings (also a member of the Northwest Conference including football, 1930-)
 Miller City Wildcats (known as Palmer until 1942, 1930-)
 Ottoville Big Green (1930-)
 Pandora-Gilboa Rockets (also a member of the Blanchard Valley Conference including football, 1952-)

Junior high schools
 Glandorf Dragons
 Ottawa Titans
 Ottawa Sts. Peter and Paul Knights

Former members
 Belmore Bears (1930–32, consolidated into Leipsic)
 McCulloughville Crawfish Eagles (1930–40, consolidated into Blanchard)
 Glandorf Dragons (1930–65, consolidated into Ottawa-Glandorf)
 Ottawa Indians (1930–65, consolidated into Ottawa-Glandorf)
 Pandora Fleetwings (1930–52, consolidated into Pandora-Gilboa)
 Ottawa Sts. Peter and Paul Knights (1930–62, school closed & became middle school)
 Vaughnsville Vikings (1930–63, consolidated into Columbus Grove)
 Gilboa Blanchard Eagles (1940–52, consolidated into Pandora-Gilboa)
 Ottawa-Glandorf Titans (1965–67)

Sandusky Bay Conference

Lake Division
 Bellevue Redmen (2017-)
 Clyde Fliers (1949–)
 Tiffin Columbian Tornadoes (2017-)
 Norwalk Truckers (2017-)
 Sandusky Perkins Pirates (1972–)
 Sandusky Blue Streaks (2017-)

Bay Division
 Milan Edison Chargers (1986–)
 Huron Tigers (1968–)
 Castalia Margaretta Polar Bears (1963–) (River Division for Football)
 Oak Harbor Rockets (1948–72, 1986–)
 Port Clinton Redskins (1948–49, 1980–)
 Vermilion Sailors (2016-)
 Willard Crimson Flashes (2017-)

River Division
 Tiffin Calvert Senecas (1958–66, 1972–86, 2016-)
 Lakeside Danbury Lakers (1948–57, 2018-)
 Gibsonburg Golden Bears (1948–59, 1963–72, 2018-)
 Bascom Hopewell-Loudon Chieftains (2019-)
 Kansas Lakota Raiders (1960–72, 2016-)
 New Riegel Blue Jackets (no football, 2016-)
 Old Fort Stockaders (no football, 2016-)
 Fremont St. Joseph Central Catholic Crimson Streaks (1948–86, 2016-)
 Sandusky St. Mary Central Catholic Panthers (1950–2014, 2016-)

Former members
 Carey Blue Devils (1958–1963)
 Elmore Bulldogs (1948–1958)
 Genoa Comets (1948–1956, to Northern Lakes League)
 Sycamore Mohawk Warriors (1960–1962)
 Fostoria St. Wendelin Mohawks (no football, 1968–1972, 2016–2017, school closed)
 Shelby Whippets (2017–2018, Football only for 2018 season, to Mid Ohio Athletic Conference)

Three Rivers Athletic Conference

 Toledo Central Catholic Fighting Irish (from Toledo City League, 2011-)
 Oregon Clay Eagles (from TCL, 2011-)
 Findlay Trojans (from Greater Buckeye Conference, 2011-)
 Fremont Ross Little Giants (from GBC, 2011-)
 Lima Senior Spartans (from GBC, 2011-)
 Toledo Notre Dame Eagles (from TCL, all-girls, 2011-)
 Toledo St. Francis de Sales Knights (from TCL, 2011-)
 Toledo St. John's Jesuit Titans (from TCL, 2011-)
 Toledo St. Ursula Arrows (from TCL, all girls, 2011-)
 Toledo Whitmer Panthers (from TCL, 2011-)

Toledo Area Athletic Conference

 Oregon Cardinal Stritch Cardinals (1995-)
 Edon Bombers (football only, 2005-)
 Toledo Emmanuel Christian Warriors (Emmanuel Baptist until 2006, no football, 1988-)
 West Unity Hilltop Cadets (football only, 2005-)
 Toledo Maumee Valley Country Day  Hawks (no football, 1988-)
 Montpelier Locomotives (football only, 2016-)
 Northwood Rangers (2000-)
 Toledo Ottawa Hills Green Bears (1988-)
 Toledo Christian Eagles (1988-)

(Edon, Hilltop, and Montpelier are football-only members, for other sports, they are members of the Buckeye Border Conference. Toledo Christian is a member of the Northern 8 Football Conference, a conference for 8-man football)

Former members
 Lorain Catholic Spartans (1994-2004, closed)
 Tiffin Calvert Senecas (2014-2016, to Sandusky Bay Conference)
 Lakeside Danbury Lakers (1988-2018, to Sandusky Bay Conference)
 Gibsonburg Golden Bears (2011-2018, to Sandusky Bay Conference)
 Stryker Panthers (football only 2018-2019, to Northern 8 Football Conference)

Toledo City League

 Toledo Bowsher Blue Racers (1962-)
 Toledo Rogers Rams (1964-)
 Toledo Scott Bulldogs/Lady Bulldogs (1926-)
 Toledo Start Spartans (1962-)
 Toledo Waite Indians (1926-)
 Toledo Woodward Polar Bears (1926-)

Former members
 Toledo Libbey Cowboys/Cowgirls (1926–2010, closed)
 Toledo Central Catholic Fighting Irish (1928-2011, to Three Rivers Athletic Conference)
 Toledo DeVilbiss Tigers (1933–1991, closed)
 Toledo Macomber-Whitney Macmen/Lady Macmen (1938–1991, closed)
 Toledo St. Francis de Sales Knights (1963-2011, to Three Rivers Athletic Conference)
 Toledo St. John's Jesuit Titans (1968-2011, to Three Rivers Athletic Conference)
 Oregon Cardinal Stritch Cardinals (1971–1994, to Toledo Area Athletic Conference)
 Toledo McAuley Lions (c. 1976-1988, closed)
 Toledo Notre Dame Eagles (c. 1977-2011, to Three Rivers Athletic Conference)
 Toledo St. Ursula Arrows (c. 1977-2011, to Three Rivers Athletic Conference)
 Oregon Clay Eagles (2003-2011, to Three Rivers Athletic Conference)
 Toledo Whitmer Panthers (2003-2011, to Three Rivers Athletic Conference)

Western Buckeye League

 Lima Bath Wildcats (1965-)
 Celina Bulldogs (1936-)
 Defiance Bulldogs (1973-)
 Elida Bulldogs (1971-)
 Kenton Wildcats (1942-)
 Ottawa Ottawa-Glandorf Titans (1967-)
 Lima Shawnee Indians (1952–67, 1981-)
 St. Marys Memorial Roughriders (1936-)
 Van Wert Cougars (1936-)
 Wapakoneta Redskins (1936-)

Former Members
Bellefontaine Chieftains (1936–65)
Bluffton Pirates (1936–57)
Coldwater Cavaliers (1957–72)
Delphos St. John's Blue Jays (1971–82)

Western Ohio Soccer Conference
The WOSC is a soccer-only conference that began in 2014. The conference contains teams (and former members) from the Midwest, Northwest, Northwest Central, and Shelby County leagues, who were all previously independent.
 Anna Rockets (Shelby County Athletic League, girls only, 2014-)
 Botkins Trojans (Shelby County Athletic League, 2014-)
 Lima Central Catholic Thunderbirds (Independent, 2014-)
 Coldwater Cavaliers (Midwest Athletic Conference, girls only, 2014-)
 Sidney Fairlawn Jets (Shelby County Athletic League, boys only, 2014-)
 Sidney Lehman Catholic Cavaliers (Northwest Central Conference, 2014-)
 Van Wert Lincolnview Lancers (Northwest Conference, 2014-)
 New Knoxville Rangers (Midwest Athletic Conference, boys only, 2014-)
 Delphos St. John's Blue Jays (Midwest Athletic Conference, girls only, 2014-)
 Spencerville Bearcats (Northwest Conference, boys only, 2014-)
 Lima Temple Christian Pioneers (Northwest Central Conference, boys only, 2014-)
 Jackson Center Tigers (Shelby County League, Boys only 2016-)
 Harrod Allen East Mustangs (Northwest Conference, Boys and Girls, 2016-)

Defunct conferences

See also
Ohio High School Athletic Association

Notes and references